Bernhard Hildebrandt Dawson (September 21, 1890 – June 18, 1960) was a U.S.-born Argentine astronomer.

He was born in Kansas City, Missouri and earned a B.S. from the University of Michigan, 1916. From 1913 onward, he worked at the La Plata Observatory, Argentina. In 1933 he was awarded a Ph.D. from Michigan with a thesis titled, "The System Beta 1000 Plus Delta 31". He was a professor at Faculdad de Ingeniería de San Juan from 1948 until 1955. His astronomical studies included southern double stars, variable stars, occultations, asteroids and comets. On November 8, 1942 he may have discovered Nova Puppis 1942. In 1958, he became the first president of the Asociación Argentina de Astronomía.

The botanist, Genoveva Dawson, is his great-granddaughter.

The asteroid 1829 Dawson is named after him, as is the crater Dawson on the far side of the Moon.

References

Bibliography

1890 births
1960 deaths
University of Michigan alumni
American emigrants to Argentina
20th-century Argentine astronomers
Burials at La Plata Cemetery